Aisin Gioro Hongxiao(Chinese : , Manchu：ᡥᡡᠩ ᡥᡳᠶᠣᡠ, hūng hiyoo；3 May 1722 – 11 May 1778) was Qing dynasty imperial prince as the seventh son of Yinxiang, Prince Yixian of the First Rank, paternal cousin of the Qianlong Emperor and Kangxi Emperor's grandson. The second in the Prince Yi of the First Rank lineage, Hongxiao became famous through his poetry and relationship with Cao Xueqin, one of the most famous Chinese writers.

Life 
Hongxiao was born on 3 May 1722 to primary princess consort Yixian of the First Rank, lady Joogiya. He had two biological sisters, including Princess Hehui of the Second Rank who was adopted into the palace since she was young, and two surviving biological brothers, including Hongjiao, Prince Ningliang of the Second Rank. On 21 June 1730, Hongxiao inherited the Prince Yi of the First Rank title as the peerage was granted iron-cap status. His younger brother was granted a title of Prince Ning of the Second Rank. Hongxiao was not implicated in the Coup of Hongxi in 1739, unlike his brother, who was deprived of his allowance 

In 1766, Hongxiao's mother died, leaving him a portion of blood. In 1767, Hongxiao and his nephew Yongkun behaved in a disrespectful manner during a national mourning (they did not wear mourning garment). However, the punishment was delayed due to Fuheng's urging. In 1768, a promotional ceremony of imperial princes was organised after the sacrificial rites at the Temple of Agriculture. A list of the princes promoted at the same time included Hongzhou, Prince He of the First Rank; Yongchang, Prince Zhuang and Guanglu; Prince Yu of the First Rank.

In August 1777, when Hongxiao made sacrifices at the Imperial Ancestral Temple together with Prince Guo of the Second Rank, the prince failed to observe etiquette and was tried by the Imperial Clan Court. The arrest was replaced by deprivation of Hongxiao's salary in the following month.

Hongxiao died on 11 May 1778 and was posthumously honoured as Prince Yixi of the First Rank (meaning "harmonious and precautious").

Relationship with Cao Xueqin 
Since his youth, Hongxiao had been known for his interest in poetry. His most notable art works include "Series of the Hall of the Four Pines" (《四松堂集》) and "Poems of the Hall of the Bright Kindness" (《明善堂集》). He was befriended with the intellectualists of the Qianlong era, e.g. Cao Xueqin. When Cao Xueqin's family experienced a downfall, which might result in confiscation of his property, Hongxiao preserved the drafts of the Dream of the Red Chamber. The reminiscences of their relationship were included in Hongxiao's poetry.

It was disputed by redologists that second characters of Yinxiang's and Hongxiao's personal names drew the outline of the plot of the original edition of "Dream of the Redchamber". However, the poor quality of Hongxiao's edition rose issues among the redologists whether those characters were included in the original text. Moreover, new scholarship undermines Hongxiao's contribution to drafts of the novel claiming that imperial prince could not have such abilities, hence the poems were written by ghostwriters.

The further fate of poetry and Prince Yi collection 
The poetry of Hongxiao remained unknown until the publication in the "Collection of the Prince Yi Manor" by Weng Tonghe, Yang Shaohe and Shen Zuyin. The collection included Hongxiao's poetry, Tibetan books dating back to the 17th century and calligraphy paintings with in summary 10 seals. Most books possessed by Hongxiao and his descendants were not included in "Siku Quanshu", that's why they were made public in the 19th century.

Family 
Hongxiao was married to lady Ligiya, daughter of Bohege (伯赫格). Later, he married lady Tunggiya, daughter of Changsheng (长盛). Hongxiao had in summary 9 sons and nine daughters. 
Consorts:

 Primary consort, of the Ligiya clan (李佳氏)
Yonghang (镇国将军 永杭, 25 December 1744 –  4  June 1777), Third Class Defender General, first son
Third son (10 May 1750 – 11 May 1750)
 Second primary consort, of the Tunggiya clan
 Secondary consort, of the Jin clan (侧福晋金氏)
 Secondary consort, of the Shi clan (侧福晋石氏)
Yonglang (怡恭亲王永琅: 5 May 1746 – 1 September 1799), Prince Yigong of the First Rank , second son
 Secondary consort, of the Irgen Gioro clan (侧福晋伊尔根觉罗氏)
Sixth son (15 July 1766 - 20 December 1766)
Seventh son (1770 - 1771), born to Lady Irgen Gioro
Yongmai (三等辅国将军 永迈; 18 December  1772 – 26 April 1799), Third Class Bulwark General, eighth son
 Mistress, of the Xu clan (庶福晋徐氏)
Yonghe (永和; April 1783 – 28 Novembee 1784)
 Mistress, of the Xiang clan (庶福晋祥氏)
 Mistress, of the Ma clan (庶福晋马氏)
Yongman (永蔓; 5 September 1752 – 15 March 1808), fourth son
 Mistress, of the Bayara clan (庶福晋巴雅拉氏)
Fifth son ( 22 July 1757 – 6 January 1758)
Unknown:

 NN. Married Jiminzhu'er Dorji of the Khorchin Borjigin clan.
 NN.
 NN
 Fourth Daughter. Married Manduhu of the Onnigud Borjigin clan in 1768
 NN
 NN
 NN
 NN
 Princess of the Third Rank (郡主). Married Mubaledan of the Harqin league  in 1779.

In fiction and popular culture 

 Portrayed by Xu Ziming in Succession War (TV series) (2018)
 Portrayed by Cheng Junwen  in Story of Yanxi Palace (2018)

References 

Qing dynasty imperial princes
Prince Yi(怡)